Worry Worry may refer to:

"Worry Worry", song written by Pluma Davis, Jules Taub, performed by B.B. King from Ladies and Gentlemen... Mr. B.B. King and Live in Cook County Jail  
"Worry Worry", song by The Fiery Furnaces from Gallowsbird's Bark
"Worry, Worry" (song), by Barei,  number 34 on the Spanish Singles Chart July 2017